Roopa Revathi, also known as Roopa K.R., is an Indian Musician, violinist & playback singer from Kerala. She started her career as a playback singer in the Malayalam movie Madampi in 2008. She has also recorded songs for Tamil and Kannada films. She was the winner of the reality show Amrita TV Super Star Global, a musical talent hunt show hosted by Amrita TV.

Personal life
Revathi was born in Ernakulam, Kerala. She started learning Carnatic music when she was five years old under Malini Hariharan and Tamarakkadu Govindan Namboothiri. 

Now, she is continuing it under P Unni Krishnan and M. Jayachandran.

Career
Revathi debuted as a playback singer in 2008 with the song "Ente Sharike" in B. Unnikrishnan's Malayalam film Madampi under music director M. Jayachandran.

In 2011, she debuted as a violinist in the Malayalam film industry through the Prithviraj Sukumaran-starrer Urumi. Deepak Dev was the composer of the film.

Reality shows
 2007 – Amrita TV Super Star Global Winner

Discography

Malayalam

Tamil

Albums

References

External links
Official Blog
Official YouTube Channel

1984 births
Living people
Indian women playback singers
Film musicians from Kerala
Malayalam playback singers
Indian violinists
Singers from Kochi
Women violinists
Telugu playback singers
Kannada playback singers
21st-century Indian singers
21st-century violinists
21st-century Indian women artists
Women musicians from Kerala
21st-century Indian women singers
Musicians from Kochi
Musicians from Kerala
Carnatic instrumentalists